Salée River may refer to:

 Salée River (Dominica)
 Salée River (New Caledonia)